Coleophora microdon  is a moth of the family Coleophoridae.

References

microdon
Moths described in 1993